is a Japanese professional footballer who plays for Albirex Niigata as a forward.

Career
Taniguchi attended Gifu Keizai University, where he served as a captain and was transformed from a center-back to a forward. He then joined Grulla Morioka for 2018 season.

Club statistics
Updated to 1 May 2021.

References

External links

Profile at J. League
Profile at Iwate Grulla Morioka

1995 births
Living people
Association football people from Mie Prefecture
Japanese footballers
J3 League players
J2 League players
Iwate Grulla Morioka players
Roasso Kumamoto players
Albirex Niigata players
Association football forwards